is a Rinzai Buddhist temple in Hyōgo Prefecture (formerly Harima province).

History
With the patronage of the Akamatsu clan, Sesson Yūbai was able to become the founder of a number of provincial Buddhist temple-monasteries, including Hōun-ji in Harima.

Hōun-ji was ranked among the provincial jissatsu by the Muromachi shogunate, which encouraged its shugo vassals to found monasteries in their domains.

Prominent among Yūbai's followers were Akamatsu Norimura (1277-1350) and his son Akamatsu Norisuke (1314-1371).

See also 
 For an explanation of terms concerning Japanese Buddhism, Japanese Buddhist art, and Japanese Buddhist temple architecture, see the Glossary of Japanese Buddhism.

Notes

References
 Hall, John Whitney. (1999). The Cambridge History of Japan: Medieval Japan, Vol. 3. Cambridge: Cambridge University Press. ;  OCLC 165440083

External links

Buddhist temples in Hyōgo Prefecture